The Kailash Range, Kailas Range, Gangdisi Mountains, Gangdese Range, Gangdisê Range or Gangdise Shan, is a mountain range on the Tibetan Plateau in Tibet and the Tibet Autonomous Region.

Geography

It is the western subrange of the Transhimalaya system. The Nyenchen Tanglha is the eastern subrange.  

One of the Gangdise Shan's peaks, Mount Kailash, is a sacred place in four religions.

See also 
 Gangdese batholith (geology of the area)

References

Further reading

Mountain ranges of Tibet
Transhimalayas
Tibetan Plateau